Judith Luzuriaga Albelda (born 17 March 1999) is a Spanish footballer who plays as a midfielder for Sporting de Huelva.

Club career
Luzuriaga started her career at CEF Nájera.

References

External links
Profile at La Liga

1999 births
Living people
Women's association football midfielders
Spanish women's footballers
People from Nájera
Footballers from La Rioja (Spain)
EdF Logroño players
Sporting de Huelva players
Primera División (women) players
RCD Espanyol Femenino players
Primera Federación (women) players